Jaden Michael is an American actor and model. He is known for portraying young Colin Kaepernick in the coming-of-age web series Colin in Black & White (2021), which follows Kaepernick's early years.

Early life and education 
Michael was born in 2003 to a single mother. The majority of his childhood was spent in New Jersey and Harlem. Currently, he is enrolled with Dwight Global Online School for his high school diploma.

Filmography

As an actor

As a dubbing artist

References 

Living people
2003 births
Hispanic and Latino American male actors